Castelino is a surname. Notable people with the surname include:

Janalynn Castelino (born 1998), Indian-Italian pop singer, songwriter and doctor 
Adline Castelino (born 1998), Miss India 2020 and Miss Universe 2020 runner up
Monica Castelino (born 1982), Indian film actress

See also
Castellino